Paul Gustaaf Julia Hoste (born 25 March 1947 in Lokeren), pseudonym Pol Hoste is a Belgian writer. He graduated in Germanic philology at the University of Ghent. He started his career as a teacher of the English and Dutch languages. From 1983 until 1985 he was an editor at Heibel and made contributions to De Morgen, De Nieuwe and the Volkskrant.

Bibliography
 De veranderingen (1979)
 Vrouwelijk enkelvoud (1987)
 Een schoon bestaan (1989)
 Brieven aan Mozart (1991)
 Een schrijver die geen schrijver is (1991)
 Ontroeringen van een forens (1993)
 High key (1995)
 Foto's met de aap (1997)
 De lucht naar Mirabel (1999)
 Montreal (2003)
 Een dag in maart (2006)

Awards
 1999 - Cultuurprijs van de Stad Gent
 2002 - Arkprijs van het Vrije Woord

See also
 Flemish literature

Sources
 Pol Hoste (in Dutch)
 H. Vandevoorde, Eenheid en fragment. Het proza van Pol Hoste, Yang 25 (1989)

1947 births
Living people
People from Lokeren
Flemish writers
Ghent University alumni
Ark Prize of the Free Word winners